Eagle Airport  is a state-owned public airport two miles east of Eagle, in the Southeast Fairbanks Census Area of Alaska.

Facilities and aircraft 
Its one runway, 6/24, is gravel, 3,600 by 75 feet (1,097 x 23 m). In 2005 the airport had 2,400 aircraft operations, 83% general aviation and 17% air taxi.

Airlines and destinations

Statistics

References

External links 
 FAA Alaska airport diagram (GIF)

Airports in the Southeast Fairbanks Census Area, Alaska